This is a list of the 21 members of the European Parliament for Austria in the 1996 to 1999 session, ordered by name. See 1996 European Parliament election in Austria for election results.

List

Austria
List
1996